The  Dick Callen House is a historic house located  south of Jerome, Idaho, United States. The lava rock home was built in 1917 by a stonemason named Otis. The home is designed in the bungalow style and features a gable roof with exposed rafters, wide eaves, and multiple purlins.

The house was listed on the National Register of Historic Places on September 8, 1993.

See also

 List of National Historic Landmarks in Idaho
 National Register of Historic Places listings in Jerome County, Idaho

References

1917 establishments in Idaho
Bungalow architecture in Idaho
Houses completed in 1917
Houses in Jerome County, Idaho
Houses on the National Register of Historic Places in Idaho
National Register of Historic Places in Jerome County, Idaho